Nasolacrimal duct cysts are a cutaneous condition that is a developmental defect present at birth.

See also 
 Skin dimple
 List of cutaneous conditions

References 

Cutaneous congenital anomalies